And That's the Truth is a 1972 comedy album by Lily Tomlin released on Polydor Records.  Tomlin recorded the album live before an audience at The Ice House in Pasadena, California.  

The album features Tomlin as one of her most celebrated characters, five-and-a-half-year old Edith Ann, who hounds a new neighbor (also played by Tomlin) with her little dramas real and imagined, as well as sage advice and tales of her family's private life.

The album was Tomlin's second record release, following her Grammy-winning  This Is A Recording. And That's The Truth earned Tomlin a second Grammy nomination as Best Comedy Recording and peaked at #41 on the Billboard Hot 200 album chart, the third highest ranking album ever on the chart by a female comedian, behind Tomlin's debut album and Joan Rivers's 1983 "What Becomes A Semi-Legend Most" (which peaked at #23).

The album was produced by Irene M. Pinn and conceived and written by Lily Tomlin and Jane Wagner with additional material by Jim Abell & Chet Dowling, Betty Beaird, Marian Brayton, Warren Burton, Susan Perkis Haven, Edward Morris, Richard Tomlin, and Bill Weeden & David Finkle.

Track listing
Each side of the album runs approximately 20 minutes and is an ongoing monologue between Edith Ann and her neighbor "Lady", although the story passages on each side of the record are named individually.  Side one is when the two meet walking on the street; side two is when Edith Ann shows up uninvited at the lady's house the next day. 

Side One:
 Hey Lady 
 I Always Kiss Buster 
 My Sister Mary Jean 
 Look in the Sky 
 I Dressed Him Up 
 Here's The Empty Lot 
 Guess This Riddle 
 I Can't Go To The Movies Here 
 I Go To Sunday School 
 Here's My House

Side Two:
 Lady Lady Open Up 
 I Like Your Kitchen 
 Do You Have Any Chewing Gum? 
 Don't My Toes Look Pretty? 
 I Will Help You Unpack 
 Does This Chair Lean Back? 
 Tell Me Something Lady 
 Finish Putting The Groceries Away 
 I Want You To Go

References

1972 live albums
Polydor Records live albums
Lily Tomlin albums
1970s comedy albums
Live comedy albums
Spoken word albums by American artists
Live spoken word albums